Vescovato  may refer to:

Places
France
Vescovato, Haute-Corse, a commune in the Département of Haute-Corse, Corsica

Italy
Vescovato, Lombardy, a comune in the Province of Cremona